Charles Rupert Bard, 2nd Viscount Bellomont (1647–1667) was the only son of Henry Bard. He was killed in action whilst serving in the Barbados Regiment, during the battle to recapture St Kitts from the French in 1667.

On his death all his titles fell extinct.

References
 thePeerage.com - Sir Charles Rupert Bard, 2nd Viscount Bellomont

1667 deaths
Bellomont, Charles Bard, 2nd Viscount
1647 births
English military personnel killed in action